Ritta Island is an island in Lake Okeechobee, Florida, near its southern shore. It was once inhabited.

Ritta island was first inhabited around the year 1909 and first surveyed for homestead in 1917. After some heavy rains flooded the island in 1922, the island was mostly abandoned but the final blow came when in 1928 a hurricane came and washed away most or all of the infrastructure on the island.

References

Former populated places in Florida
Former populated places in Palm Beach County, Florida
Lake islands of Florida
Lake Okeechobee